San Jose Township was a defunct township in Los Angeles County, California.  It existed prior to the abolition of townships in California, and appeared as a subdivision of Los Angeles County in the 1860, 1870 and 1880 U.S. Censuses.  Its area encompassed Rancho San Jose, the eastern portions of the county drained by San Jose Creek, including what is now the cities of Pomona, Claremont and Walnut.  In 1880, it was recorded as having 1170 residents - which made it one of the smallest townships in Los Angeles County, but nevertheless a sizable settlement in the region, larger than Bakersfield and slightly smaller than Riverside (in that year, there were only three settlements with populations above 1000 in Southern California outside Los Angeles and Ventura counties.)

The territory of the township included, among others, villages known as Spadra and Lordsburg. Louis Phillips, reportedly the richest man in Los Angeles County in the late 19th century, was one of the residents of Spadra. The township was crossed by two east-west railroads, California Central Railway (later Southern California Railway) to the north, with a train station at Lordsburg, and Southern California Railway to the south, with a station at Spadra (ten miles east of Puente and three miles west of Pomona.) Lordsburg was eventually incorporated as La Verne, California, and Spadra was annexed by Pomona.

References

Former settlements in Los Angeles County, California
Former townships in Los Angeles County, California